The Kawasaki Ninja 250SL (codenamed BX250), formerly called Ninja RR Mono in Indonesia (until November 2016, later changed to 250SL), is a motorcycle in the Ninja sport bike series from the Japanese manufacturer Kawasaki sold since 2014. The bike replaces the 2-stroke Ninja ZX-150RR (also called Ninja RR) that was produced from 1991 to 2016.

It is the first Ninja sport bike to have a four-stroke single-cylinder engine.

References 

Ninja 250SL
Motorcycles introduced in 2014